Trichiorhyssemus is a genus of aphodiine dung beetles in the family Scarabaeidae. There are more than 20 described species in Trichiorhyssemus.

Species
These 26 species belong to the genus Trichiorhyssemus:

 Trichiorhyssemus adhabharicus (Pittino, 1983)
 Trichiorhyssemus alternatus Hinton, 1938
 Trichiorhyssemus asperulus (Waterhouse, 1875)
 Trichiorhyssemus bicolor (Clouët, 1901)
 Trichiorhyssemus bisigillatus (Bénard, 1924)
 Trichiorhyssemus cloueti Koshantschikov, 1916
 Trichiorhyssemus congolanus (Clouët, 1901)
 Trichiorhyssemus cristatellus (Bates, 1887)
 Trichiorhyssemus dalmatinus Petrovitz, 1967
 Trichiorhyssemus decorsei Bénard, 1914
 Trichiorhyssemus elegans (Petrovitz, 1963)
 Trichiorhyssemus fokiensis Petrovitz, 1968
 Trichiorhyssemus fruhstorferi Petrovitz, 1968
 Trichiorhyssemus hauseri Balthasar, 1933
 Trichiorhyssemus hispidus Pittino, 2007
 Trichiorhyssemus kitayamai Ochi, Kawahara & Kawai, 2001
 Trichiorhyssemus lasionotus Clouët, 1901
 Trichiorhyssemus longetarsalis Bénard, 1921
 Trichiorhyssemus microtrichius Ochi, Kawahara & Inagaki, 2011
 Trichiorhyssemus nepalensis (Pittino, 1983)
 Trichiorhyssemus occidentalis (Endrödi, 1976)
 Trichiorhyssemus pseudoinscitus (Pittino, 1984)
 Trichiorhyssemus riparius (Horn, 1871)
 Trichiorhyssemus setulosus (Reitter, 1892)
 Trichiorhyssemus taiwanus Ochi, Masumoto & Lee, 2015
 Trichiorhyssemus yumikoae Pittino & Kawai, 2007

References

Further reading

 
 
 

Scarabaeidae
Articles created by Qbugbot